Eilema aldabrensis is a moth of the subfamily Arctiinae first described by George Hampson in 1914. It is found on Aldabra in the Seychelles.

References

Moths described in 1914
aldabrensis
Fauna of Seychelles